The Armor "Pambato" Division was formerly known as the Mechanized Infantry Division before it was renamed in anticipation of its upcoming assets and ongoing reorganization of units of the Philippine Army as part of the modernization program. It is stationed at Camp O'Donnell, Brgy. Sta. Lucia, Capas, Tarlac and is one of the service's major units. The Armor Division is a combined arms organization composed of tank, cavalry and mechanized infantry.

History 
The Armor "Pambato" Division traces its origins to the cavalry units raised by the Spanish Army during the long years of colonial rule and the revolution. These units are the following:

 Colonial Horse Guards Squadron (raised 1755, first cavalry unit to be raised in the islands) 
 Colonial Dragoons Regiment (raised 1772 as a Squadron, later raised into a Regiment, the first in the islands, stood down 1860) 
 Aguilar Hussars Cavalry Militia Regiment (Colonial Militia) (raised 1804) 
 1st (Philippine) Chasseur Squadron (raised 1860, later became the 31st Cavalry Regiment "Philippine Cavalry") 
 2nd (Spanish) Lancer Squadron (raised 1860) 
 Cavalry units raised during the Philippine Revolution by the Katipunan during 1896–1898, and in 1898, cavalry units were organised led by Captain Lorenzo Zialcita. Other separate groups include the Esquadrones de-Voluntarios from Northern Mindanao. 
 Presidential Cavalry Squadron raised in late 1898 for the defense of the President and his First Family.

The Philippine Revolutionary Army, starting in 1898, officially included the cavalry as one of its arms.

During the American occupation, a full cavalry regiment, the 26th Cavalry Regiment, Philippine Scouts, was formed in 1922 to provide a cavalry regiment to the regular forces of the Philippine Scouts. This regiment was based in Fort Stostenburg, Angeles, Pampanga. With the formation of the AFP in 1935 came the formation of the 1st Cavalry Regiment under the 1st Infantry Division, Philippine Army. But, just as during the revolutionary period, the 1st Cavalry Regiment was assigned to Malacanang Palace with the duties of the protection of the President, the First Family, and the palace complex, modeled more after the Household Cavalry and the Indian President's Bodyguard. At the same time, the concept of armored forces was being introduced to the AFP. An old Renault FT 17 tank used during the First World War became the first armored vehicle to be used in the Philippines, albeit only for training purposes. This is the very tank featured in the modern cavalry insignia used by the PA.

During the Second World War's opening days, the 26th Cavalry staged the final cavalry charge in US Army history on Jan. 16, 1942, while fighting the Japanese in Morong, Bataan. (The 1st Cavalry Regiment later stood down in March of the same year.) During the stages of the defense of Bataan, for the first time, tanks and armored vehicles were used in battle in the Philippines, replacing the horses. Units using them including the 194th and 192nd Tank Battalions and the 17th Ordnance Company (Armored), United States Army, which later became the Provisional Tank Group, USSAFE (using M3 Stuarts, Universal Carriers and M3 Gun Motor Carriages) and the 2nd Provisional Tank Battalion of the 2nd Regular Division, PA, USSAFE (also using the Bren gun carriers).

After the war, M4 Shermans, among other vehicles, formed the basis of the armored and mechanized forces of the PA. The 1st and 2nd Light Tank Companies were raised in 1946 to provide the starting blocks for armored warfare in the country. The Philippine Army also created and organised of Battalion Combat Teams (BCT), that saw action during the Korean War, as part of the Philippine Expeditionary Forces to Korea, such as the 10th BCT Tank Company, where they participated the Battle of Yultong, led by Conrado Yap. After the war in Korea, on March 1, 1954, the 1st Cavalry Squadron was organised.

Later, a tank training company was formed in Pampanga to train PA servicemen in armored warfare techniques. Such as the Division Reconnaissance Company, which was soon upgraded as the 1st Tank Battalion in 1960. On April 1, 1974, the 1st Light Armor Battalion was organised under the 1st Infantry Division, which led t to the creation of more related units in other brigades and battalions in the Philippine Army. These units were then part of major infantry divisions until the creation of the Philippine Army Light Armor Regiment (PALAR) on August 16, 1976, integrating all armored units within one single unit.

Origin of moniker "Pambato" 
The Philippine Army Light Armor Regiment (PALAR) was upgraded to the Light Armor Brigade on March 19, 1986, and had major organisational changes until in 2006, it was again upgraded to Light Armor Division, renamed as Mechanized Infantry Division in 2011 and finally redesignated as the Armor (Pambato) Division in 2019.  

The moniker "Pambato" was first used in 1976 during its PALAR days. It was said then that Pambato means "piling yunit ng hukbong katihan na panlaban sa larangan ng pakikidigma" (English: Chosen unit of the Army in the field of war). This is pronounced "pambato" with stress at the second syllable "ba" synonymous with "panlaban" which is translated in English as "bet" or the single best unit/person/item amongst a group in the same category, in the hope of winning the field or game they are playing.

Units 

The following are the combat units that are under the Armor Division.

Brigades

 1st Mechanized Infantry (Maasahan) Brigade 
 2nd Mechanized Infantry (Magbalantay) Brigade

Battalions
 1st Tank (Masikan) Battalion (Reactivated) 
 1st Mechanized Infantry (Lakan) Battalion 
 2nd Mechanized Infantry (Makasag) Battalion 
 3rd Mechanized Infantry (Makatarungan) Battalion 
 4th Mechanized Infantry (Kalasag) Battalion
 5th Mechanized Infantry (Kaagapay) Battalion
 6th Mechanized Infantry (Salaknib) Battalion

Cavalry Battalion

 1st Cavalry (Tagapanguna) Battalion
 2nd Cavalry (Kaagapay)Battalion

Companies/troops (separate)

 1st Light Armored Cavalry (Rapido) Troop 
 2nd Light Armored Cavalry (Tagapaglingkod) Troop 
 3rd Light Armored Cavalry (Katapangan) Troop 
 4th Light Armored Cavalry (Karangalan) Troop 
 5th Light Armored Cavalry (Kasangga) Troop 
 6th Light Armored Cavalry (Paghiluigyon) Troop 
 7th Light Armored Cavalry (Masasarigan) Troop

Aviation units
 Army Aviation "Hiraya" Regiment

Support 

 Headquarters & Headquarters Service Battalion 
 Army Aviation (Bagwis) Battalion
 Signal (Kalatas) Company 
 Engineer Combat (Sambisig)Company 
 Armor Maintenance (Masinop)Battalion 
 Armor School

Assets 
The Armor Division integrates infantry operations with mechanized formations. Its current equipment are:

 130 V-150 Commando APC
 51 Armored Infantry Fighting Vehicle
 6 ACV-15
 266 M113 Armored Personnel Carrier
 150 Simba Amored Personnel Carrier
 7 Scorpion Light Tank
 2 Sabrah Light Tank (+16)

Future Assets:
 10 Sabrah Tank destroyer
 1 ASCOD ARV
 1 ASCOD ACV
 28 Guarani 6x6

Former assets:
Renault FT tank 
M4 Sherman 
75mm SPM
Universal Carrier 
M3 Stuart 
M24 Chaffee 
M41 Walker Bulldog

Operations 

 Anti-guerrilla operations against the New People's Army, MILF, and Abu Sayyaf Group.

References 

Military units and formations of the Philippine Army
Tarlac